Between Here and Gone is the eighth studio album by Mary Chapin Carpenter.  It was released April 27, 2004.  The album reached number five on Billboard's Top Country Albums chart, although the album itself produced no chart singles. The title track was written by Carpenter upon hearing of the death of singer-songwriter Dave Carter.

This was Carpenter's last studio album on Columbia Records Nashville.

Track listing 
All songs written by Mary Chapin Carpenter
 "What Would You Say to Me" – 3:43
 "Luna's Gone" – 4:16
 "My Heaven" – 5:53
 "Goodnight America" – 5:36
 "Between Here and Gone" – 5:08
 "One Small Heart" – 6:02
 "Beautiful Racket" – 4:40
 "Girls Like Me" – 4:27
 "River" – 4:21
 "Grand Central Station" – 4:25
 "The Shelter of Storms" – 5:18
 "Elysium" – 5:29

Barnes & Noble Limited Edition (Bonus CD)

Live acoustic performance from the Singer/Songwriter tour, October 2003:

 "I Still Miss Someone" (live) – 5.17
 "This Shirt" (live) – 5.08
 "Late for Your Life" (live) – 4:57

Borders Limited Edition (Bonus DVD)

 "Down at the Twist and Shout" (music video)
 "I Feel Lucky" (music video)
 "Shut Up and Kiss Me" (music video)
 "The Better to Dream of You" (music video)
 "Almost Home" (music video)

Personnel
 David Angell - violin
 Richard Bennett - electric guitar
 Mary Chapin Carpenter - acoustic guitar, Leslie guitar, lead vocals, background vocals
 Chad Cromwell - drums
 Eric Darken - percussion
 Dan Dugmore - steel guitar
 Stuart Duncan - fiddle
 Shannon Forrest - drums
 Rob Ickes - dobro
 John Jennings - acoustic guitar
 Viktor Krauss - bass guitar
 Anthony LaMarchina - cello
 Jerry McPherson - electric guitar
 Tim O'Brien - mandolin
 Dean Parks - electric guitar
 Matt Rollings - keyboards
 Garrison Starr - background vocals
 Mary Kathryn Van Osdale - viola
 Kristin Wilkinson - string arrangements, viola
 Glenn Worf - bass guitar

Chart performance

References

External links 

2004 albums
Mary Chapin Carpenter albums
Columbia Records albums
Albums produced by Matt Rollings